Agonum fallianum is a species of ground beetle in the Platyninae subfamily that can be found in the United States.

References

Beetles described in 1918
fallianum
Endemic fauna of the United States
Beetles of North America